Beyond the Line of Duty is a 1942 American short propaganda film, directed by Lewis Seiler. The documentary film reenacted the life and career of United States Army Air Corps Captain Hewitt T. "Shorty" Wheless.

Following the attack on Pearl Harbor, Hollywood rushed to turn out films that would help to help win the war. The studios produced more than features, with countless cartoons and short subjects that were intended to inform the public, boost morale, encourage support of the Red Cross and other organizations that were helping at home and overseas or in recruitment. There were also films that were shown only to members of the armed forces. These films either trained them or entertained them.

Beyond the Line of Duty is one of the best examples of how Hollywood pitched in and worked to boost morale and also recruit men and women into military service. The film won the Oscar for Best Short Subject at the 15th Academy Awards in 1943.

Plot
In 1942, the story of the heroism of an airman was introduced in the April 28 Fireside Chat by President Franklin Delano Roosevelt. The story relates to the life and career of Hewitt T. Wheless as an bomber pilot in the United States Army Air Corps (USAAC). Beginning when Wheless, working as a ranch hand in Texas, joined the Army Air Corps in 1938, the account follows through theoretical and practical training in courses at Randolph Field, Texas. He later graduated as a pilot, receiving his wings at Kelly Field, Texas.

Qualifying as a bomber pilot, Lt. Wheless was stationed in the Philippines with the 19th Bombardment Group. On December 14, 1941, in the first weeks of World War II, Wheless was the pilot of a four-engine Boeing B-17 Flying Fortress heavy bomber assigned a bombing mission to attack Japanese warships and transports in the harbor at Legaspi, Philippine Islands.

While Wheless was able to successfully complete his mission, his bomber was attacked by 18 enemy fighters. During the running aerial battle, three gunners were wounded and a fourth killed while seven fighters were reportedly downed. Wheless was able to return to base and land the aircraft safely in the dark with three flat tires.

In his nationwide address, President Roosevelt praised the pilot's extraordinary heroism and noted that Wheless had received the Distinguished Flying Cross. In a tribute to the remarkable strength of his B-17 bomber, Captain Wheless later gave a speech at the Boeing factory in Seattle, thanking the workers.

Cast

 Hewitt T. Wheless as himself (as Captain Hewett T. Wheless)
 Ronald Reagan as narrator (voice)
 Franklin Delano Roosevelt as himself (voice) (archive footage)
 Hubert R. Harmon as himself (as Major General H.K. Harmon)
 William Hopper as University of Texas classmate
 Glenn Strange as Cal
 Knox Manning as Radio announcer

Production
Beyond the Line of Duty was produced with the full cooperation of the USAAC, with Captain Wheless serving as a technical advisor. The film begins with the strains of the fourth verse of the "Air Corps Song": 
Off we go into the wild sky yonder, Keep the wings level and true;
If you'd live to be a gray haired wonder, keep the nose out of the blue.
Flying men, guarding the nation's borders, we'll be there followed by more!
In echelon, we carry on, for nothing can stop the Army Air Corps!

Reception
Beyond the Line of Duty was typical of the propaganda films of the period produced under the auspices of the Office of War Information. The film was distributed and exhibited by Warner Bros. under the auspices of the Motion Picture Committee Cooperating for National Defense. Beyond the Line of Duty was the third wartime film short produced by Warner Brothers Studios and proved popular with audiences.

Awards
Beyond the Line of Duty won an Academy Award at the 15th Academy Awards in 1943 for Best Short Subject (Two-Reel).

See also
 Ronald Reagan filmography
 First Motion Picture Unit

References

Notes

Citations

Bibliography

 Koppes, Clayton R. and Gregory D. Black. Hollywood Goes to War: How Politics, Profits and Propaganda Shaped World War II Movies. New York, The Free Press, 1987. .

External links
 
 
 

1942 films
1942 drama films
1942 short films
American aviation films
American black-and-white films
American drama films
American World War II propaganda shorts
Films about the United States Army Air Forces
Films directed by Lewis Seiler
First Motion Picture Unit films
Live Action Short Film Academy Award winners
Warner Bros. short films
World War II films based on actual events
1940s English-language films
1940s American films